Uncial 086 (in the Gregory-Aland numbering), ε 35 (Soden), is a Greek — Coptic diglot, uncial codex of the New Testament, dated paleographically to the 6th century.

Description 

The codex contains two small parts of the Gospel of John 1:23-26; 3:5-4:23-35.45-49 on 13 parchment leaves (27 cm by 23 cm). The text is written in two columns per page, 20 and more lines per page.

It is a palimpsest, the upper text contains a Coptic tables and formulae. 

The Greek text of this codex is a mixed type. Aland placed it in Category III.

Currently it is dated by the INTF to the 6th century.

The codex now is located at the British Library (Or. 5707) in London.

See also 
 List of New Testament uncials
 Coptic versions of the Bible
 Textual criticism

References

Further reading 

 W. E. Crum & F. G. Kenyon, Two Chapters of St John in Greek and Middle Egyptian, JTS 1 (1899-1900), pp. 415–433.
 U. B. Schmid, D. C. Parker, W. J. Elliott, The Gospel according to St. John: The majuscules (Brill 2007), pp. 81–107. [new reconstruction of the text of the codex]

External links 
 Uncial 086 at the Wieland Willker, "Textual Commentary"

Greek New Testament uncials
6th-century biblical manuscripts
Greek-Coptic diglot manuscripts of the New Testament
Palimpsests
British Library oriental manuscripts